The Little Rock Trojans are the athletic teams representing the University of Arkansas at Little Rock. The Trojans are a non-football member of the Ohio Valley Conference and a wrestling affiliate member of the Pac-12 Conference. The University offers 7 men's and 8 women's varsity sports. Little Rock has Sun Belt rivalries with all the West Division schools (Arkansas State, Louisiana–Monroe, Louisiana–Lafayette, Texas State, and UT Arlington). Little Rock's primary in-state rival is Arkansas State.

For the 2005–06 basketball season, the Trojans moved into the $25 million Jack Stephens Center.

On July 1, 2015, the Trojans officially announced they would no longer be branded as "Arkansas–Little Rock" or "UALR," but will be the Little Rock Trojans effective immediately.

Starting in the 2022-23 athletic season the Trojans will join the Ohio Valley Conference as their primary athletic conference.

Sports

Basketball 

In the years since becoming a four-year university, Little Rock has won slightly more games than they've lost. However, during the six-year coaching tenure of Mike Newell, the Trojans made a big splash on the national stage. Appearing in their first ever NCAA tournament game in 1986, the 14th seeded Little Rock beat the heavily favored and 3rd seeded Notre Dame Fighting Irish, coached by Digger Phelps, now a college basketball analyst for ESPN, 90 to 83. The Trojans lost in the second round to North Carolina State, 80 to 66 in two overtimes.

The 1986 NCAA Tournament success led to post-season appearances for the Trojans in each of the next four seasons. In 1987, Little Rock beat Baylor, Stephen F. Austin and California to make it to the National Invitation Tournament finals in New York City.  The Trojans lost to both LaSalle and Nebraska to finish fourth.  The next season, Little Rock lost to Louisiana Tech in the first round of the NIT.

The Trojans returned to the NCAA tournament in 1989 and 1990, losing to Louisville 76–71 in 1989 and to eventual tournament champion UNLV 102–72 the next season.

With five tournament appearances out of six seasons in Little Rock, Newell departed after the 1990 season and the Trojans didn't return to post-season play until the 1996 NIT under coach Wimp Sanderson, the Trojans' most recent tournament game.

The Trojans played in the 2011 NCAA Tournament, their first appearance since 1990, after winning the Sun Belt Conference Tournament championship.

The women's team has also had its fair share of success since beginning play in 1969 and joining Division I in 1999. They have won the conference tournament in 2011, 2012, 2015 while competing in the NCAA tournament four times in the past seven years (2010, 2011, 2012, and 2015), while going to the Second Round in the first and latter appearances.

Little Rock plays its home games in the Jack Stephens Center, an on-campus facility that seats 5,600. Prior to this home, the Trojans played at Alltel Arena (now Verizon Arena) in North Little Rock, Arkansas. Previous to that, Little Rock's home games were played in Barton Coliseum on the Arkansas State Fairgrounds in Little Rock.

Football 
Though the football program has long since been disbanded, the Trojans were a national powerhouse when the school was known as Little Rock Junior College. Coach Jimmy Karam revived a program in 1947 that hadn't played football since 1933. The team won the 1947 Coffee Bowl 31–7 against Coffeyville Junior College and played in the 1948 Junior Sugar Bowl, losing 18–7 to South Georgia. In 1949, the team went undefeated and won the Junior Rose Bowl in Pasadena, California, defeating Santa Ana Junior College 25–19 and earned the junior college national championship. The LRJC team had played their way to the Junior Rose Bowl by winning the Little Rock Shrine Bowl for the right to meet the California junior college champion.

Wrestling 
On March 17, 2018, just hours before the start of the Division I NCAA wrestling championship finals, Little Rock announced the addition of a wrestling program. The school received a $1.4 million pledge from Arkansas businessman Greg Hatcher, considered the father of Arkansas wrestling for helping the sport grow in a state that did not field high school wrestling programs before 2008. The program began in 2019 and is the first Division I program in Arkansas. Little Rock joins Presbyterian and the unified Long Island University program as new Division I programs in 2019. In June 2018, Little Rock named former Oklahoma State wrestler and assistant Neil Erisman as their first head coach.

Little Rock's first commit was Kansas state champion Conner Ward.

As a member of the non-wrestling Ohio Valley Conference (just like its previous conference, the Sun Belt), the team is an associate member of the Pac-12. On January 24, 2021, Little Rock had its first win against a Division I school (Fresno State) and followed it up with a win against Pac-12 rival CSU Bakersfield.

Paul Bianchi became the school's first NCAA qualifier at 133 pounds in 2021. He finished 1-2 in the tournament, earning the Trojans their first NCAA Tournament win and finishing T58 with half a point.

References

External links